Diary of a Coquette (German:Tagebuch einer Kokotte) is a 1929 German silent drama film directed by Constantin J. David and starring Fee Malten, Ernst Stahl-Nachbaur and Alfred Döderlein.

Cast
 Fee Malten as Susanne Plarot  
 Ernst Stahl-Nachbaur as Konsul Hechenberg  
 Alfred Döderlein as Sein Sohn Helmuth  
 Paul Henckels as Plarot, Susannes Vater  
 Walter Hasenclever as Sekretär des Konsuls  
 Ossip Runitsch as Hoteldirektor Lambert  
 Mary Kid as Lucie, ein Strassenmädel  
 Hella Kürty as Lotte, Lucies Freundin  
 Mathias Wieman as Arzt  
 Ida Wüst as Nachbarin  
 Alexandra Schmitt as Ladenbesitzerin  
 Marianne Moudjalet as Kind

References

Bibliography
 Bock, Hans-Michael & Bergfelder, Tim. The Concise CineGraph. Encyclopedia of German Cinema. Berghahn Books, 2009.

External links 
 

1929 films
Films of the Weimar Republic
German drama films
German silent feature films
Films directed by Constantin J. David
1929 drama films
Films produced by Seymour Nebenzal
German black-and-white films
Silent drama films
1920s German films
1920s German-language films